Cirsium hydrophilum is a species of thistle which is endemic to California, where it is found only in the San Francisco Bay Area and the Sacramento-San Joaquin River Delta. This native thistle grows in wet boggy habitats.

Description
Cirsium hydrophilum may reach  in height with a branching, cobwebby stem. The leaves are longest near the base of the plant, approaching  in length. They are cut into toothed lobes and covered in spines, particularly along the petiole.

The head is lined with sticky, twisted, spiny phyllaries and contains pink to purple flowers.

Varieties
There are two very localized varieties:
The rare Cirsium hydrophilum var. hydrophilum, the Suisun thistle, is known from two occurrences in the Suisun Marsh, in the salt marsh habitat of the Delta in Solano County. It is treated as a federally listed endangered species.
The very rare Cirsium hydrophilum  var. vaseyi, Mt. Tamalpais thistle or Vasey's thistle,  is known from about twenty occurrences on Mount Tamalpais in Marin County, in Vacaville, California in Solano County, and inside the Presidio in the City of San Francisco. It is currently not a listed federal or state endangered species.

References

External links
Jepson Manual Treatment - Cirsium hydrophilum
The Nature Conservancy-NatureServe: Cirsium hydrophilum

hydrophilum
Endemic flora of California
Natural history of the California chaparral and woodlands
Natural history of the Central Valley (California)
Natural history of Marin County, California
Taxa named by Willis Linn Jepson
Critically endangered flora of California